Pajovë is a village and a former municipality in the District, Elbasan County, central Albania. At the 2015 local government reform it became a subdivision of the municipality Peqin. The population at the 2011 census was 6,626. The municipal unit consists of the villages Pajovë, Gryksh i Madh, Bishqem, Paulesh, Bishqem Fushë, Leqit, Lazaren, Haspiraj, Hasnjok, Cengelaj, Garunje e Papërit and Cacabeze.

References

Former municipalities in Elbasan County
Administrative units of Peqin
Villages in Elbasan County